Uinta National Forest  is a national forest located in north central Utah, USA. It was originally part of the Uinta Forest Reserve, created by Grover Cleveland on 2 February 1897. The name is derived from the Ute word Yoov-we-teuh which means pine forest. Because of changes to the boundaries over the years, the Uinta Mountains are now located in the Wasatch-Cache National Forest.

The Uinta National Forest was headquartered in Provo, Utah with four outlying district offices located in Pleasant Grove, Heber, Spanish Fork, and Nephi, Utah until August 2007.  The Uinta National Forest is now managed as one unit along with the Wasatch-Cache National Forest as the Uinta-Wasatch-Cache National Forest.  Managing , the Uinta National Forest is less than 45 minutes south of Salt Lake City and only minutes away from Provo, Utah. In descending order of land area it is located in parts of Utah, Wasatch, Juab, and Sanpete counties.

Wilderness areas
There are three officially designated wilderness areas in Uinta National Forest that are part of the National Wilderness Preservation System. One of them lies partly in neighboring Wasatch National Forest.
 Lone Peak Wilderness (partly in Wasatch NF)
 Mount Nebo Wilderness
 Mount Timpanogos Wilderness

See also
List of U.S. national forests
Uinta

References

External links
Uinta-Wasatch-Cache National Forest